Gao Yan may refer to:

Gao Yan (Northern Qi emperor), Emperor Xiaozhao of Northern Qi
Gao Yan (Northern Qi prince), prince of Northern Qi, son of Emperor Wucheng
J. J. M. de Groot, Chinese name Gao Yan, Dutch sinologist
Gao Yan (politician), former Communist Party Secretary of Yunnan, Governor of Jilin, and leader of the State Power Corporation of China
Gao Yan (student), Peking University student, who committed suicide in 1998 after allegations of rape against a prominent professor

See also
Gaoyang (disambiguation)